Herman Tuvesson (21 October 1902 – 2 February 1995) was a Swedish wrestler. He competed at the 1932 Summer Olympics and the 1936 Summer Olympics.

References

External links
 

1902 births
1995 deaths
Swedish male sport wrestlers
Olympic wrestlers of Sweden
Wrestlers at the 1932 Summer Olympics
Wrestlers at the 1936 Summer Olympics
People from Hässleholm Municipality
Sportspeople from Skåne County
20th-century Swedish people